Scânteiești is a commune in Galați County, Western Moldavia, Romania with a population of 2,686 people. It is composed of two villages, Fântânele and Scânteiești.

References

Communes in Galați County
Localities in Western Moldavia